Femur condyle may refer to:

 Lateral condyle of femur
 Medial condyle of femur